Winning of the West is a 1953 American Western film directed by George Archainbaud and starring Gene Autry and Gail Davis.

Plot

Main cast
 Gene Autry as Gene Autry  
 Champion as Champ - Gene's Horse  
 Gail Davis as Ann Randolph  
 Richard Crane as Jack Autry aka Jack Austin  
 Robert Livingston as Art Selby  
 House Peters Jr. as Marshal Jim Hackett  
 Gregg Barton as Clint Raybold  
 William Forrest as Editor John Randolph  
 Smiley Burnette as Smiley

References

Bibliography
 Rowan, Terry. The American Western A Complete Film Guide. 2013.

External links
 

1953 films
1953 Western (genre) films
American Western (genre) films
Films directed by George Archainbaud
Columbia Pictures films
American black-and-white films
1950s English-language films
1950s American films